Eden Castle is a castle near Banff in Aberdeenshire, Scotland.

The castle was built in the latter half of the 16th century by the Meldrum family with renovation and additional building carried out by George Leslie from 1676.  From 1712, the castle was owned by William Duff, the Earl of Fife.  Although largely ruined today, it formed a z-plan towerhouse with two towers at diagonally opposite corners of the main block.

The site has been designated a scheduled monument.

References

External links
https://canmore.org.uk/site/18380/eden-castle
https://ancientmonuments.uk/120483-eden-castle-troup-ward
https://thecastleguy.co.uk/castle/eden-castle/
http://www.scotland-inverness.co.uk/Chatelaine/EDEN.HTM

Ruined castles in Aberdeenshire
Scheduled Ancient Monuments in Aberdeenshire